The Jewish Press is an American weekly newspaper based in Brooklyn, New York, and geared toward the Modern Orthodox Jewish community. It describes itself as "America's Largest Independent Jewish Weekly". 

The Jewish Press has an online version which is updated daily and reportedly has a readership of 2 million views each month.

History  
The Press was founded in 1960 by Rabbi Sholom Klass, a Yeshiva Torah Vodaath graduate who had grown up in Williamsburg and who previously co-published the Brooklyn Daily.

In 1994, Klass stated that the Press would not accept advertising from the United Jewish Appeal, describing it as subsidies for competitors.

The current editor, since late May of 2021, is Shlomo Greenwald, a grandson of the founders of the publication.  Elliot Resnick served as the paper's chief editor until May of 2021.  It is believed he was replaced due to the controversy of Resnick entering the United States Capitol on January 6, 2021, and then not indicating as such while writing for the newspaper.  Resnick also made many controversial statements and published controversial pieces against the LGBT community. Former editors have included Jason Maoz, Meir Kahane, Arnold Fine, Julius Liebb and Steve Walz. The online edition is run by Stephen Leavitt.

Editorial policy
The Jewish Press is oriented toward the Haredi Orthodox Jewish community, covering Jewish news from New York City, the United States, and Israel. The newspaper describes itself as having a politically conservative viewpoint and editorial policy, and "politically incorrect long before the phrase was coined."

In 1990, ultraconservative Catholic weekly The Wanderer reported about a notice posted in The Jewish Press excommunicating U.S. Representative Barney Frank, seeking to affirm similar practice in the Catholic Church. It was later pointed out to them that the notice was posted by an outlier, and that Judaism lacked a centralized excommunication process. Abraham Hecht, president of the Rabbinical Alliance of America, said "If we were going to start excommunicating, we'd have a list as long as the New York telephone directory".

In March 2014, The newspaper fired its Israel-based online edition editor Yori Yanover after he wrote an op-ed titled "50 Thousand Haredim March So Only Other Jews Die in War." The piece was in reference to a Haredi Jewish prayer rally in Manhattan protesting the draft of yeshiva students to the Israel Defence Forces. The editorial board issued an apology saying "The article in question was posted without authorization and approval of The Jewish Press newspaper" and "the sentiments expressed in the article and headline do not represent these of the Jewish Press, its officers, editors and staff." Yanover wrote a response in which he replied, "I wrote the article after discussion with my supervisor and then submitted the article for review, as per the protocol you established."

Sections
 News: includes news focusing on the Middle East, recent news items with anti-Israel bias, and kosher food news.
 Opinion: includes editorials, Israeli political analysis, and Op-Eds.
 Features: includes religious columns, Jewish law, a weekly kosher dining guide, the Jewish Press Magazine, and youth sections. Monthly specials are printed in addition to features and supplements before each of the major Jewish holidays.
 Cartoons: includes political cartoons focusing on major Jewish holidays, current events, and Israeli cuisine.

Contributors
Some of The Jewish Presss contributors include Jerold Auerbach, Hollywood screenwriter Robert J. Avrech, Dr. Louis Rene Beres, Dr. Phyllis Chesler, Prof. Paul Eidelberg, photographer Jacob Elbaz, historian and mathematician Dr. L. (Yitzchok) Levine, Dr. Morris Mandel, Dr. Steven Plaut, Dr. Marvin Schick, cartoonist Asher Scwartz, and legal ethicist and Judaica collector Saul Jay Singer, who writes a weekly column on Collecting Jewish History.

Religious contributors
The Jewish Press features numerous weekly Torah columns regarding the weekly Torah portion, upcoming Jewish holidays, contemporary applications of Jewish law, philosophy, Talmud, and the teachings of Nachman of Breslov. Current and previous authors include Rabbi Meir Kahane, Rebbitzen Esther Jungreis, Rabbi Dovid Goldwasser, Rabbi David Hollander, Rabbi Rafael Grossman, Rabbi Hanoch Teller, Rabbi Berel Wein, Rabbi Isaac C. Avigdor, Rabbi Steven Pruzansky, Rabbi Gershon Tannenbaum, Rabbi Emanuel Quint, Rabbi J. Simcha Cohen, Rabbi Francis Nataf, and Rabbi Nathan Lopes Cardozo.

Political contributors
During the mid-1970s, Ronald Reagan wrote a weekly column for the paper. Other contributing elected officials include Dov Hikind, Simcha Felder, former Knesset Member Menachem Porush, former Israeli prime minister Menachem Begin, former New York City Mayor Ed Koch, Knesset Member Yisrael Eichler, and Moshe Feiglin.

Bloggers
Among the blogs and bloggers published on JewishPress.com are Donny Fuchs, Paula R. Stern's A Soldier's Mother, Jameel @ The Muqata, JoeSettler, Harry Maryle's Emes ve-Emuna, @IsraelShield, Batya Medad's Shiloh Musings, Frimet and Arnold Roth's This Ongoing War, David Israel, Israel Mizrahi's musings on rare and unusual Jewish books, and Ambassador (ret.) Yoram Ettinger's The Ettinger Report.

See also

 The Forward, a Jewish newspaper 
 The Jewish Week, a Jewish newspaper

References

External links

Jewish newspapers published in the United States
Newspapers published in Brooklyn
Newspapers established in 1960
Weekly newspapers published in the United States